Richard Clark is a British television director.

He is the winner of the 2011 Ray Bradbury Award for Outstanding Dramatic Presentation (with Neil Gaiman) for directing the Doctor Who episode "The Doctor's Wife".

Selected filmography
My Dead Buddy (1997)
 Life on Mars
 2.3 (2007)
 2.4 (2007)
 Doctor Who
 "Gridlock" (2007)
 "The Lazarus Experiment" (2007)
 "The Doctor's Wife" (2011)
 "Night Terrors"(2011)
 The Musketeers
 "The Good Soldier" (2014)
 "A Rebellious Woman" (2014)

References

External links

British television directors
Hugo Award winners
Nebula Award winners
Year of birth missing (living people)
Living people